Jennifer Jasinski is an American chef who owns and runs several restaurants in Denver, Colorado. She won the James Beard Foundation Award for Best Southwest Chef in 2013.

Career
Jennifer Jasinski was born and raised in Santa Barbara, California, until she decided to attend The Culinary Institute of America at its Hyde Park, New York campus. She worked first in kitchens in New York City, before moving to Los Angeles, California, where she worked under Wolfgang Puck. In 2000, she moved to Denver, Colorado, where she became head chef at the Panzano restaurant within Hotel Monaco. She stayed for five years, until together with Beth Gruitch, she opened her own restaurant, Rioja, within the same city. For her work at the restaurant, she won the James Beard Foundation Award for Best Southwest Chef in 2013.

She has since opened several further restaurants in Denver including Euclid Hall, Bistro Vendome and Stoic & Genuine. A further location opened in late 2017 at Denver Union Station, entitled Ultreia, which was based on the Iberian  style of dining. The new restaurant was located near to the existing Stoic & Genuine, which serves a seafood based menu.

References

External links

Living people
People from Santa Barbara, California
American women chefs
American television chefs
Top Chef contestants
Year of birth missing (living people)
James Beard Foundation Award winners
21st-century American women